Nils Ufer (17 June 1939 – 2 January 1993) was a Danish journalist and editor. He received the Cavling Prize for his coverage of the Tamil scandal for Weekendavisen in 1992, and also wrote the five-hour single-character play Mens vi venter på retfærdigheden about the affair.

Early life
Ufer was born in Copenhagen, the son of artist Johannes Ufer and secretary Gunhild Ufer, née Sørensen.

Career
Ufer began his career as a journalist at Fyns Tidende in Odense. He worked for Dagbladet Information from 1964 to 1974. In 1968, he covered the Paris student riots for the newspaper.

He left Dagbladet Information to assume a position as editor of the satirical magazine Corsaren in 1984 but returned to the newspaper in 1985.

In 1987, Ufer joined Weekendavisen. He played a central role in the uncovering of the Tamil scandal. He won the Cavling Prize posthumously for his coverage of the scandal in 1992.

Acting
Ufer appeared as an actor in six Danish feature films in the period 1969-1974:
 Den gale dansker (1969)
 Giv Gud en chance om søndagen (1970)
 Kære Irene (1971)
 Revolutionen i vandkanten (1971)
 Mor, jeg har patienter (1972)
 Prins Piwi (1974)

Personal life
Ufer died unexpectedly in 1993. He is buried at Assistens Cemetery in Copenhagen.

Written works
 Den nøgne journalist (1988)
 Det skjulte folk'' (1991)

References

Danish editors
Danish male film actors
20th-century Danish male actors
Dagbladet Information people
Weekendavisen people
1939 births
1992 deaths
20th-century Danish journalists